The 2009 Turkish GP2 Race was the third race of the 2009 GP2 Series season. It was held on June 6 and 7, 2009 at Istanbul Racing Circuit in Tuzla, Turkey. The race was used as a support race to the 2009 Turkish Grand Prix.

The Feature race was won by Vitaly Petrov after an eventful Race which saw many safety car periods. Championship leader Romain Grosjean did not finish, like almost half the field. Lucas di Grassi of Racing Engineering won his first race of the season in Sprint Race after being given pole due to penalties issued after the feature race.

Karun Chandhok set the fastest lap in the Sprint Race, but he was not awarded a point for it. This is because he finished outside the top ten. The point for the fastest lap of the race goes to the driver inside the top ten, who was fastest around the circuit, in this case Vitaly Petrov. This allowed the Russian to increase his lead with an extra point.

Standings after the round 

Drivers' Championship standings

Teams' Championship standings

 Note: Only the top five positions are included for both sets of standings.

External links
 https://web.archive.org/web/20090611192621/http://www.gp2series.com/en/website/2009gp2series/news/newsgp2/newsdetail.php?articleid=2360
 http://www.autosport.com/news/report.php/id/75833
 http://www.autosport.com/news/report.php/id/75895
 http://gp2series.com/en//website/2009gp2series/news/newsgp2/newsdetail.php?articleid=2381
 http://www.autosport.com/news/report.php/id/75911

Tuzla
GP2
Auto races in Turkey
June 2009 sports events in Turkey